The Pari Chowk is the metro station of Noida Metro in Knowledge Park I, Greater Noida, Uttar Pradesh, India. It was opened on 25 January 2019.

The station
This station is a part of Noida metro rail corporation's Aqua Line. Passengers won't be able to use their DMRC smart card on this line and there is no interlink as yet between Aqua line and other lines of Delhi metro. Soon NMRC metro linked with blue line Delhi metro. The market place around the metro Station is Ansal Plaza. The mall is quite good to spend a beautiful evening and have snacks. The mall also have a threater to enjoy movies on the big screen.

References

External links

Delhi Metro stations
Railway stations in Gautam Buddh Nagar district
Noida Metro stations